Gangteng Gewog (Dzongkha: སྒང་སྟེང་) is a gewog (village block) of Wangdue Phodrang District, Bhutan. It used to be known as Gangte or Gangtey.

See also 
Phobjika Valley

References 

Gewogs of Bhutan
Wangdue Phodrang District